Lal Lal Wind Farm is a wind farm under construction southeast of Ballarat in the Australian state of Victoria. There are 38 turbines two kilometres east of Yendon and a further 22 turbines two kilometres north of Elaine. 

The project was developed by WestWind Energy. The proposal was bought by Macquarie Capital in 2017, and financing was completed by onselling 40% to each of Northleaf Capital Partners and InfraRed Capital with Macquarie retaining the other 20%. RES Australia is contracted to manage the build and first five years of operation. Construction is done by Zenviron and Vestas.

During the construction phase, one of the operating wind turbines was damaged on 15 September 2019 by a lightning strike during a storm. A direct hit resulted in one blade of a turbine being destroyed and falling to the ground. no other damage was reported.

References

Wind farms in Victoria (Australia)